The Igor Cassini Show was a DuMont Television Network talk show hosted by columnist Igor Cassini, who wrote under the name "Cholly Knickerbocker". The show aired Sunday evenings from October 25, 1953, to February 28, 1954.

Episode status
As with many DuMont series, no episodes are known to exist.

See also
List of programs broadcast by the DuMont Television Network
List of surviving DuMont Television Network broadcasts
1953-54 United States network television schedule

References

Bibliography
David Weinstein, The Forgotten Network: DuMont and the Birth of American Television (Philadelphia: Temple University Press, 2004) 
Alex McNeil, Total Television, Fourth edition (New York: Penguin Books, 1980) 
Tim Brooks and Earle Marsh, The Complete Directory to Prime Time Network TV Shows, Third edition (New York: Ballantine Books, 1964)

External links
The Igor Cassini Show at IMDB
DuMont historical website

DuMont Television Network original programming
1953 American television series debuts
1954 American television series endings
Black-and-white American television shows
American television talk shows
Lost television shows